Harrison Craig (born 7 September 1994) is an Australian singer who won the second series of The Voice Australia. Craig was coached in the program by British singer Seal. Craig has had three songs on the ARIA Singles Chart top 10 with his cover of "Unchained Melody" reaching No. 2 and his original song, "More Than a Dream", at No. 3. His debut album titled More Than a Dream was released on 25 June 2013. His second album L.O.V.E was released 11 April 2014, and his third, Kings of Vegas, in November 2016.

The Voice Australia

Performances

Personal life
Craig lives in Chelsea, Melbourne with his mother, Janine and his brother Connor. His father left the family when Craig was six. Craig battles a stutter when he speaks but it has improved since competing in The Voice. To help build his confidence, his mother encouraged him to join the Victorian Boys Choir and undertake private voice lessons. He completed his VCE in 2012 at Sandringham College, where he was Music Captain.
In 2010 Craig fronted Garage Band High and sang the lead on their video of the song "Viva la Vida".

Influences
Craig is influenced by many artists of different genres, including Elvis Presley, Andrea Bocelli, Michael Buble, Nat King Cole, and many more. His music typically falls into the composite genre of "popera."

Discography

Studio albums

Singles

Guest appearances

Tours
 More Than a Dream Tour (2013)
 L.O.V.E. Mother's Day Tour (2014)
 Kings of Vegas Lounge Sessions Tour (2017)

References

Living people
Australian pop singers
Singers from Melbourne
The Voice (Australian TV series) contestants
The Voice (franchise) winners
Universal Music Group artists
1994 births
21st-century Australian singers
21st-century Australian male singers
People from Chelsea, Victoria